The 2006–07 season was Real Madrid Club de Fútbol's 76th season in La Liga. This article lists all matches that the club played in the 2006–07 season, and also shows statistics of the club's players.

Season summary
The summer of 2006 saw Real choose a new and returning coach, Fabio Capello coming from Juventus in the wake of 2006 Italian Football scandal.

Capello brought several recent and previous Juventus players with him to the club, but all of them made a huge impact, the team instead relying on the goalscoring from Ruud van Nistelrooy during all season long.

Real returned to domestic league glory under Fabio Capello helm after a 3–1 victory against Mallorca in the last game of the season, but the club surprisingly sacked Capello shortly after winning the La Liga title after Capello refused to field David Beckham and Ronaldo as well as defensive tactics. He was replaced by a surprise candidate Bernd Schuster from Getafe for the following season. On the other hand, Real Madrid suffered painful Copa del Rey exit against Real Betis in the Round of 16 phase as well as UEFA Champions League exit against Bayern Munich in the Round of 16.

Players

Transfers
Real Madrid 2006-07 – first team shirt numbers

In

|}

Total spending:  €100,500,000

Club

Technical staff

Kit

|
|
|

Other information

Pre-season and friendlies

Competitions

La Liga

League table

Matches

Results summary

Results by round

Points evolution

Source: LPF

Position evolution

Source: LPF

Copa del Rey

Round of 32

Round of 16

Champions League

Group E

Round of 16

Statistics

Squad stats

See also
2006–07 La Liga
2006–07 Copa del Rey
2006–07 UEFA Champions League

Notes and references

Real Madrid
Real Madrid CF seasons
Spanish football championship-winning seasons